Tropidia coloradensis is a species of hoverfly in the family Syrphidae.

Distribution
United States.

References

Eristalinae
Diptera of North America
Taxa named by Jacques-Marie-Frangile Bigot
Insects described in 1884